Linpus Linux is a Fedora Linux-based operating system created by the Taiwanese firm Linpus Technologies Inc.  Linpus was designed specifically to fully support the Asian market, with full Unicode support for the Chinese and Japanese languages. A special version, Linpus Lite, was written to run on devices with lower-cost hardware such as netbooks. It has both an icon and tab-based "Simple mode", designed for new users; and, a conventional style "PC mode" for those wanting a more Microsoft Windows-like interface. It is targeted at handheld devices with smaller screens, and supports resolutions as low as VGA (640×480).

The Acer Aspire One and Norhtec Gecko netbooks come with Linpus Lite Linux pre-installed, there is also a version of the Acer Revo 3610 and 3700 with Linpus Linux pre-installed.

A version for normal desktop computers and servers is also available, as well as a Multimedia version called Linpus Media Center.  The Media Center version offers an "Upgrade pack" to purchase patent licenses from MPEG-LA for DVD, MP3, WMV and a few other codecs.

Nagware
The Linpus system contains not only the free and open source operating system, but also Acer-specific "shareware" - users  classify this as "nagware," because it asks you to register on Acer's website and purchase a full version. The fact that the Acer distribution contains this software prevents the system from being considered a fully free/open operating system.

References

External links 

RPM-based Linux distributions
Linux distributions used in appliances
Taiwanese brands
Linux distributions